William Collins (14 May 1871 – 13 July 1942) was an Australian rules footballer who played for the Carlton Football Club in the Victorian Football League (VFL).

Collins debuted for Carlton in 1899, then returned home to Rutherglen to play with Excelsior in their 1900 Ovens & Murray Football League premiership before returning to Carlton to play the last three games in 1900.

Notes

External links 

	
	
Bill Collins's profile at Blueseum

1871 births
Australian rules footballers from Victoria (Australia)
Carlton Football Club players
1942 deaths
Place of death missing
Rutherglen Football Club players